The Cherokee Group is a Pennsylvanian geologic group in Missouri and Iowa. The group contains most of the economic coal deposits of Missouri and Iowa.

See also

 List of fossiliferous stratigraphic units in Missouri
 Paleontology in Missouri

References

 

Geologic groups of Missouri
Carboniferous Iowa